The 2015–16 USC Trojans men's basketball team represented the University of Southern California during the 2015–16 NCAA Division I men's basketball season. They were led by third-year head coach Andy Enfield. They played their home games at the Galen Center and were members of the Pac-12 Conference. They finished the season 21–13, 9–9 in Pac-12 play to finish in a three-way tie for sixth place. They defeated UCLA in the first round of the Pac-12 tournament to advance to the quarterfinals where they lost to Utah. They received an at-large bid to the NCAA tournament where they lost in the first round to Providence.

Previous season 
The 2014–15 USC Trojans finished the season with an overall record of 12–20, and 3–15 in the Pac-12 regular season. In the 2015 Pac-12 tournament, the Trojans defeated Arizona State, 67–64 in the first round, before losing to UCLA, 70–96 in the quarterfinal. USC became the first 12-seed to win a game in the Pac-12 Tournament.

Off-season

Departures

Incoming transfers

2015 recruiting class

Roster

}

Schedule

|-
!colspan=12 style="background:#990000; color:#FFCC00;"| Non-conference regular season

|-
!colspan=12 style="background:#990000;"| Pac-12 regular season

|-
!colspan=12 style="background:#990000;"| Pac-12 tournament

|-
!colspan=12 style="background:#990000;"| NCAA tournament

Ranking movement

References

USC
USC Trojans men's basketball seasons
USC Trojans men's basketball
USC Trojans men's basketball
USC